Diposthidae is a family of flatworms belonging to the order Polycladida.

Genera:
 Asthenoceros Laidlaw, 1903
 Diposthus Woodworth, 1898

References

Platyhelminthes